Ten Bloody Marys & Ten How's Your Fathers is an Elvis Costello and the Attractions album comprising tracks not previously released on albums. It is largely made up of B-sides, but features three previously unreleased recordings. It was released only in the UK, initially only on cassette, though later in other formats.

Its track listing is very similar to that of the North America-released album Taking Liberties; the differences are that on the latter, the tracks "Watching The Detectives", "Radio, Radio" and "(What's So Funny 'Bout) Peace, Love and Understanding" are replaced by "Night Rally", "(I Don't Want to Go to) Chelsea" and "Sunday's Best".

Track listing
All songs written by Elvis Costello except as indicated.

Side one
 "Clean Money" (previously unreleased) – 1:57
 "Girls Talk" (B-side of "I Can't Stand Up for Falling Down", 1980) – 1:56
 "Talking in the Dark" (B-side of "Accidents Will Happen", 1979) – 1:56
 "Radio Sweetheart" (B-side of "Less Than Zero", 1977) – 2:24
 "Big Tears" (B-side of "Pump It Up", 1978) – 3:10
 "Crawling to the USA" (from soundtrack to Americathon, 1979) – 2:52
 "Just a Memory" (B-side of "New Amsterdam", 1980) – 2:14
 "Watching the Detectives" (non-album single, 1977) – 3:43
 "Stranger in the House" (non-album single, 1978) – 3:01
 "Clowntime Is Over" (Version 2, B-side of "High Fidelity", 1980) – 3:44

Side two
 "Getting Mighty Crowded" (Van McCoy) (B-side of "High Fidelity", 1980) – 2:05
 "Hoover Factory" (previously unreleased) – 1:43
 "Tiny Steps" (B-side of "Radio, Radio", 1978) – 2:42
 "(What's So Funny 'Bout) Peace, Love and Understanding" (Nick Lowe) – 3:31
 "Dr. Luther's Assistant" (B-side of "New Amsterdam", 1980) – 3:28
 "Radio, Radio" (non-album single, 1978) – 3:04
 "Black and White World (No. 2)" (previously unreleased) – 1:51
 "Wednesday Week" (B-side of "Accidents Will Happen", 1978) – 2:02
 "My Funny Valentine" (Richard Rodgers, Lorenz Hart) (B-side of "Oliver's Army", 1979) – 1:25
 "Ghost Train" (B-side of "New Amsterdam", 1980) – 3:05

References

Albums produced by Elvis Costello
Albums produced by Nick Lowe
B-side compilation albums
1980 compilation albums
F-Beat Records compilation albums
Elvis Costello compilation albums